KFXF-LD, virtual channel 7 (UHF digital channel 22), is a low-power primary MeTV and secondary MyNetworkTV-affiliated television station licensed to Fairbanks, Alaska, United States. Owned by Atlanta-based Gray Television, it is a sister station to NBC affiliate KTVF (channel 11) and Class A CBS affiliate KXDF-CD (channel 13). The three stations share studios on Braddock Street in downtown Fairbanks, where KFXF-LD's transmitter is also located.

History

KFXF intellectual unit

The KFXF-LD intellectual unit originated on April 20, 1992, when Tanana Valley Television Company signed on K07UU as the area's first commercial station (and fifth in general after KJNP-TV in 1981) since 1955, when KTVF and KATN started. The station upgraded to a full-power license and changed its call letters to KFXF on February 27, 1995.

From its inception, the station was primarily affiliated with Fox. In its early years, K07UU/KFXF ran programming from Canadian music channel MuchMusic during the overnight hours, and for a time in 1993–94 carried the NBA on NBC. Until K13XD (now KXDF-CD) went on the air in August 1996, KFXF also carried some CBS shows. The station also ran UPN programs from 2000 to 2006, when that network merged with The WB to form The CW, which is shown on a digital subchannel of KATN.

After Gray Television's purchase of KTVF, KXDF-CD, and the non-license assets of KFXF on January 13, 2017, all of KFXF's programming was moved to KFXF-LD, which had previously served as a translator of KFXF. The full-power station's license (which was not included in the sale because the market has only five full-power stations, too few to create a duopoly) changed its call letters to KFYF on February 9, 2017 and was subsequently cancelled on March 10.

License
On March 14, 1995, the Federal Communications Commission granted a construction permit for a new low-powered station in Fairbanks, which received the K22EY call letters. The station signed on 1996.

In 2000, several low-powered stations owned by Goldbelt, Inc. (including K22EY) were sold to ACS Television, L.L.C. ACS Television, a subsidiary of Alaska Communications System, operated its stations as a wireless cable system; ACS put the subsidiary up for sale in 2002 due to financial losses and the costs of converting the stations to digital television. On April 23, 2003, Tanana Valley Television Company acquired 10 stations (including K22EY) from ACS Television. In 2010, the station flash-cut from analog to digital, modifying its call sign to K22EY-D.

The call letters were changed to KFXF-LD on November 4, 2016. On November 8, 2016, Northern Lights Media, the subsidiary of Gray Television that operates Anchorage stations KTUU-TV and KYES-TV, announced that it would buy KTVF, KFXF-LD and KXDF-CD (then known as KXDD-CD) for $8 million in cash. The sale was completed on January 13, 2017.

Fox announced on October 30, 2017 that it would move its Fairbanks affiliation from KFXF-LD to a subchannel of KATN on November 4; KFXF then became a MyNetworkTV affiliate. In a statement, Gray said that renewing the Fox affiliation "was not financially feasible." For nearly two years after KFXF-LD's affiliation change, the station's schedule remained intact for all hours outside of the Fox lineup as meanwhile the MyNetworkTV schedule replaced the Fox prime time lineup. By October 2019, Gray replaced all programming on KFXF-LD outside of the MyNetworkTV schedule with the MeTV schedule, quietly continuing to air MyNetworkTV programs between  2 a.m. and 4 a.m. on Tuesdays through Saturdays.

As of November 2021, KFXF-LD moved to virtual channel 7, which was formerly used by the full power KFXF until 2017.

Full-market over-the-air coverage 
In addition to its own digital signal, KFXF-LD receives full-market over-the-air coverage via a high definition simulcast on KTVF's second digital subchannel (UHF channel 26.2 or virtual channel 11.2) from a transmitter on the Ester Dome. The simulcast is most likely a direct compensation for how on March 2, 2017, Tanana Valley Television surrendered their license for KFYF (the original full-market over-the-air high definition distributor of the programming carried by KFXF-LD) back to the FCC, which canceled it on March 10.

Subchannels
The station's digital signal is multiplexed:

References

External links
 Official website 
 

1996 establishments in Alaska
MyNetworkTV affiliates
MeTV affiliates
Television channels and stations established in 1996
XDF-LD
Low-power television stations in the United States
Gray Television